Acidosasa chienouensis is a species of bamboo native to China.

References

Bambusoideae
Endemic flora of China
Grasses of China
Plants described in 1983